Min Swe is a Burmese politician and political prisoner. In the 1990 Burmese general election, he was elected as an Pyithu Hluttaw member of parliament, winning a majority of 20,358 (64% of the votes), but was never allowed to assume his seat.

Min Swe has a Bachelor of Science degree from Rangoon University and an education diploma from the Rangoon Institute of Education. From 1967 to 1984, he worked as a high school teacher. Min Swe joined the National League for Democracy following the 8888 Uprising.

From 28 October 1996 to 9 October 2001, Min Swe and his son Thein Swe were arrested for allegedly violating the Private Tuition Act for opening a private school.

His son Thein Swe currently serves as a Pyithu Hluttaw MP.

References

National League for Democracy politicians
Prisoners and detainees of Myanmar
1944 births
Living people
University of Yangon alumni
People from Ayeyarwady Region